Whipple is an unincorporated community in Fayette County, West Virginia, United States.

External links
 Coalfields of the Appalachian Mountains – Elverton, WV

References

Unincorporated communities in Fayette County, West Virginia
Unincorporated communities in West Virginia
Coal towns in West Virginia